Jojanneke van den Berge (Eindhoven, 30 May 1980) is a Dutch journalist who worked for the broadcasting association PowNed.

Background
Van den Berge studied Communication Science and International Development Studies at the University of Amsterdam.

Career
For three years she wrote stories for the opinion magazine HP/De Tijd and until September 2010 also for the free newspaper De Pers. For that paper she wrote together with Mark Koster as Koster and Jojanneke.

From September 2010 until July 2012 she worked as a reporter for the PowNed television programme PowNews.

References

1980 births
Living people
Dutch television journalists
Dutch women journalists
Dutch television presenters
Dutch women television presenters
Dutch reporters and correspondents
People from Eindhoven
University of Amsterdam alumni
21st-century Dutch women